Mull Hill (Manx: Cronk Meayll also called Meayll Hill or The Mull) is a small hill in the exclave of Rushen Parish at the southern end of the Isle of Man, just outside the village of Cregneash. It is the site of a chambered cairn called Mull Circle or Meayll Circle. Near the summit of the hill also lie the remains of a World War II Chain Home Low RDF station.

Mull Hill Stone Circle is a unique archaeological monument. It consists of twelve burial chambers placed in a ring, with six entrance passages each leading into a pair of chambers. Sherds of ornate pottery, charred bones, flint tools and white quartz pebbles have been found in the burial chambers. This archaeological monument was built around 3500 BC; it is a site of legends with diverse stories about haunting.

The word Meayll'' means "bald" in Manx Gaelic.

 Meayll Circle 

 References Bibliography 
 Citations'''

External links

 360 Panoramas of Meayll Circle

Marilyns of the Isle of Man
Mountains and hills of the Isle of Man
Tourist attractions in the Isle of Man